Asia Miles is a loyalty and frequent-flyer program launched by Cathay Pacific. Launched in February 1999, it allows members to earn miles by making different purchases with co-branded credit cards or on partnered flights, hotels, dining, financial services, retail, and technology products and services. Membership is free and open to individuals aged two or above.

Other than Asia Miles, Cathay Pacific also owns the Marco Polo Club, a four-tiered paid frequent-flyer program for Cathay Pacific and Oneworld member airlines flights. Marco Polo Club members are automatically enrolled as members of Asia Miles. As of 2020, the program has over 11 million members and over 800 programme partners worldwide.

History 
Asia Miles and its managing company, Cathay Pacific Loyalty Programmes Limited, was launched and founded in February 1999 in Hong Kong. The company was then renamed to Asia Miles Limited.

In January 2015, 4.7 million miles and gifts worth HK$100,000 were stolen from 121 accounts, four persons were arrested. Stronger online security measures were introduced and affected accounts were reimbursed.

In July 2019, Cathay Pacific took over low-cost carrier HK Express as a wholly owned subsidiary. The airline joined Asia Miles while closing down their own frequent-flyer program reward-U. All reward-U points are converted to Asia Miles, with a one-off conversion rate of 8 reward-U points to 1 Asia Miles.

In January 2020, Asia Miles changed their miles expiration rule from a time-based expiry system to activity-based system, where users can keep their miles by using the miles every 18 months.

Partner airlines 
Although Cathay Pacific is one of the founding members of the Oneworld alliance, Asia Miles has partnered with multiple airlines outside the alliance.

, other than Cathay Pacific and its subsidiary airline HK Express, partnered airlines include:

 Air Canada
 Air China
 Air New Zealand
 Alaska Airlines
 American Airlines
 Austrian Airlines
 Bangkok Airways
 British Airways
 Finnair
 Gulf Air
 Iberia
 Japan Airlines
 Jet Airways
 LATAM
 Lufthansa
 Malaysia Airlines
 Philippine Airlines
 Qantas
 Qatar Airways
 Royal Jordanian 
 S7 Airlines
 Shenzhen Airlines
 SriLankan Airlines
 Swiss International Air Lines

Other partnerships 
Asia Miles has partnered with over 800 partners in dining, hotel, telecom, and retail sectors for earning and redeeming miles.

Co-branded credit cards are also launched since 2016 for earning miles. Asia Miles partnered with Standard Chartered for their first co-branded credit card in 2016 and American Express for the Hong Kong market. Further partnerships with banks such as China CITIC Bank, Cathay United Bank, and BNU were made for co-branded credit cards in outside markets such as mainland China, Taiwan, and Macau.

Miles expiration 
Originally, Asia Miles were earned under a time-limited system, set to expire after three years. This was changed in January 2020 to an activity-based system where miles will remain valid as long they are either earned or redeemed at least once every 18 months.

References 

Frequent flyer programs
Cathay Pacific